Lieutenant General Abel Shilubane, born 1952. He is a retired South African Army general who served as Chief of Defence Intelligence from 2010 to 2012.

Military career

He served in the Umkhonto weSizwe in exile and after the democratic elections, he served in the SANDF. He was appointed as South Africa's Chief of Defence Intelligence after a short stint in an acting capacity from April 2009. Gen Shilubane was confirmed on the post of CDI in November 2010.

Gen Shilubane retired with pension from the SANDF in 2012 and was posted as an Ambassador to Senegal.

Awards and decorations

References

 

South African Army generals
1952 births
Living people